Ladislav Prášil (born 17 May 1990) is a Czech shot putter.

He won his first major medal, a bronze, at the 2013 European Indoor Championships. He repeated this achievement on home soil, coming third at the 2015 European Indoor Championships held in Prague.

His personal best throw is 21.47 meters, achieved in April 2013 in Potchefstroom.

Competition record

References

External links 
 
 

1990 births
Living people
Czech male shot putters